The Ciocadia is a right tributary of the river Gilort in Romania. It discharges into the Gilort in Bengești. The upper reach of the river is also known as Cărpiniș.

References

Rivers of Romania
Rivers of Gorj County